Jay Kantola was an American naval architect who is most known for his work designing multihull sailboats.  He began designing multihulls in the 1960's. Kantola was an early proponent of a vessel construction technique called cold molding and cored construction. Cold molding involves bending strips of wood at room temperature to form a desired shape. The shape is then retained by gluing the wood together using epoxy. When the shaped construction is coated with layers of fiberglass saturated with epoxy, the final construct is termed a cored or composite construction. Kantola was one of several designers that worked closely with Meade Gougeon, Joel Gougeon, and Jan Gougeon. These brothers are collectively known as the Gougeon brothers. They also designed vessels and founded a line of epoxy products called West System.

Kantola primarily produced the plans and blueprints for others to construct the final product. One builder he worked closely with for many years was Richard Barrie of Western Boatworks of Reseda, California. Perhaps the most famous vessel that resulted in this collaboration was the 1/8th scale model of the stern section of the vessel RMS Titanic. The  stern section was utilized in the sinking scenes shot for the movie Titantic. A second model of the entire vessel at a scale of 1/20th actual size now resides in a museum.

Kantola also designed the personal sailing vessels built by Ricard Barrie and his wife Kris Barrie for their own use.  The Barrie family weathered a storm aboard the Kantola designed trimaran named Fifth Fox in May 1984 that had winds over 50 knots. In the 1990's, they built a much larger trimaran named Windswept. Windswept is believed to have been the largest trimaran designed by Kantola. It took the Barrie couple 8 years to build the 65 foot (19.8 meter) long by 40 foot (12.2 meter) wide vessel. It was ultimately launched in 2000. The vessel featured four cabins, two heads, a large living area, and a 79 foot tall mast. It could sail at speeds in the low 20 knot range.

Other vessels designed by Kantola 

 Name, trimaran, launched 1979, 34 ft long
 StarTide, trimaran, launched in the late 1980's length approximately 38 ft
 Name?, trimaran, launched 1981, 35 ft
 Mike Carlson's trimaran, launched?, 39 ft
 Haiku, trimaran, launched 1985, 44 ft long and 26.5 ft wide

External links 
 YouTube Video of the making of the Titanic Model (Head builder Richard Barrie can be seen at 2:04)

References 

Multihull designers
Year of birth missing (living people)
Living people